Pio D'Antini (August 20, 1983) and Amedeo Grieco (August 25, 1983) are an Italian comedy duo who work on stage, film, television and books as Pio e Amedeo.

Filmography 
 Amici come noi (2014)
 Ma tu di che segno sei? (2014)
 Belli ciao (2022)

Tv
Occhio di Bue (Telefoggia, 2004)
U' Tub (Telenorba, 2008)
Sbattiti (Telenorba, 2009)
Stiamo tutti bene (Rai 2, 2011)
Base Luna (Rai 2, 2011)
Le Iene (Italia 1, 2012-)
Emigratis (Italia 1, 2016-2018)

Radio
Password, with Nicoletta (RTL 102.5, 2013)

References

External links 
Pio e Amedeo - duo comico - official website
Pio e Amedeo - Le Iene

Italian male film actors
People from Foggia
Italian male stage actors
1983 births
Living people
Italian comedy duos
Italian television personalities
Italian comedians
Italian male writers